Spider Kiss (originally titled Rockabilly) is a 1961 novel by American author Harlan Ellison.

Plot
A seemingly shy and humble country boy named Luther Sellers is discovered to have a magnificent voice and mesmerizing stage presence. He is given the stage name Stag Preston and after a short time on the "Chittlin' Circuit" becomes a major rockabilly music star under the tutelage of a manager who seems to be patterned after Elvis Presley's manager, "Colonel" Tom Parker. Over time Luther's success goes to his head and his "Aw, shucks..." demeanor simply becomes a gimmick used to keep his fans, whom he secretly despises, believing that he hasn't really left his country roots and humble upbringing.
 
In reality Stag lives up to his stage name, using his fame and seductive powers to lure any woman he can into his bed, leaving broken hearts and scandals everywhere he goes. The latter are all tidied up by his money-grubbing manager, who doesn't want anything to taint his cash cow. Meanwhile, Stag's growing megalomania eventually has him treating everyone around him like dirt and becoming harder and harder to work with. Eventually he is entangled in a scandal that takes all their power to cover up, and sets into motion the events leading to Stag's downfall.

References

1961 American novels
Novels by Harlan Ellison
Novels about music
English-language novels
Gold Medal Books books